Lyubov Kozyreva (born December 12, 1956) is a former volleyball player for the USSR. Born in Krasnozavodsk, she competed for the Soviet Union at the 1980 Summer Olympics.

References 

1956 births
Living people
Soviet women's volleyball players
Olympic volleyball players of the Soviet Union
Olympic gold medalists for the Soviet Union
Medalists at the 1980 Summer Olympics
Volleyball players at the 1980 Summer Olympics
People from Sergiyevo-Posadsky District
Sportspeople from Moscow Oblast